Sopater  (Sṓpatros) was the son of Pyrhus, a man from the city of Berea, mentioned in Acts 20:4. Sopater and others (Aristarchus and Secundus of the Thessalonians, and Gaius of Derbe, and Timothy, and Tychicus and Trophimus of Asia) accompanied Paul out of Macedonia after a group of Jews began to plot against Paul, and then sailed from Philippi to Alexandria Troas where they met Paul who had gone by land.

Sosipater is honored as Saint Sosipater by the Eastern Orthodox Church with a feast day on 29 April.

Notes

References

People in Acts of the Apostles
People in the Pauline epistles
Christianity in Roman Macedonia
Ancient Beroeans